The  Boston Redskins season was the franchise's 3rd season in the National Football League . The team finished with a record of six wins and six losses and finished in second place in the Eastern Division of the National Football League. They failed to qualify for the playoffs for the third consecutive season.

Regular season

Schedule

Standings

References

Boston Redskins
Boston Redskins seasons
1934 in sports in Massachusetts